Krishna Krishna is a 2001 Indian Tamil language comedy film directed by S. Ve. Shekher, making his directorial debut. The film stars S. Ve. Shekher and Sukanya, with Vennira Aadai Moorthy, Sriman, Chinni Jayanth, Thyagu, Ramesh Khanna, Manorama, and Kovai Sarala playing supporting roles. The film was released on 8 June 2001. The film was adapted from S. Ve. Shekher's stage drama Adhirshtakaran.

Plot 
Gopalakrishnan, a perfect gentleman, wants to get married as soon as possible. His mother 'Bullet' Pushpa only wants an extremely wealthy daughter-in-law so she rejects every marriage proposal. While Bama hates the kind of rich grooms her father brings for her whose only qualification is that they are rich.

One day, Bama, having decided to get married to the first bachelor she sees, sees Gopalakrishnan at the bus stop and she falls in love at first sight with him. Finally, after much effort from her end they fall in love with each other and get married in a police station without their parents' permission.

After the marriage, 'Bullet' Pushpa and Bama often quarrel for small matters. Bama hates lies, if the same person lied to her four times, she will not bear the person. Soon, Bama suspects the innocent Gopalakrishnan for having bad habits based on circumstantial evidences. She decides to divorce him. What transpires later forms the crux of the story.

Cast 

S. Ve. Shekher as Gopalakrishnan
Sukanya as Bhamadevi/Bhama
Vennira Aadai Moorthy as Duck  Dhakshinamoorthy/Vathumadaiyan (Bhama's father)
Sriman as Balakrishnan
Chinni Jayanth as Krishnamani Raja
Thyagu
Ramesh Khanna as Sivaramakrishnan
Manorama as 'Bullet' Pushpa
Kovai Sarala as Kaveri
Vichithra as Rukmani
Madhan Bob
Balu Anand as Unnikrishnan
Pandu as Marriage Broker
Sindhu as Kalpana
K. R. Vatsala
Vijisha
Vaishali
Vandhana
M. R. Krishnamurthy
Alex
G.K.
Idichapuli Selvaraj
Kullamani
Visu as Advocate Viswanathan (guest appearance)

Production 
Krishna Krishna is adapted from S. Ve. Shekher's play Adhirshtakaran.

Soundtrack 

The film score and the soundtrack were composed by S. A. Rajkumar. The soundtrack, released in 2001, features 5 tracks with lyrics written by Piraisoodan, Kalidasan, Krithaya, Kovi Kovan and the director S. Ve. Shekher.

References 

2001 films
2000s Tamil-language films
Indian comedy films
Films scored by S. A. Rajkumar
Indian films based on plays
Films about marriage
2001 directorial debut films